The Commenta Bernensia, also known as the Bern scholia, are commentaries or marginal notes in a 10th-century manuscript, Cod. 370, preserved in the Burgerbibliothek of Berne, Switzerland. 
The commentaries relate to classical Latin texts, including Lucan's De Bello Civili, and Vergil's Eclogues and Georgics (see Filargirius).

The commentary expands on a reference of Lucan's to the druidic human sacrifice to Teutates (Mercury), Esus (Mars) and Taranis (Jupiter). It states that victims dedicated to Teutates were drowned, those dedicated to Esus were hanged and those to Taranis were burned.

See also
Threefold death
Fragmenta Bernensia

External links
Catalog entry 
"The Bern Scholia" (chronarchy.com)
Scholia in Lucani bellum civile edidit Hermannus Usener, pars prior, commenta Bernensia, Lipsiae in aedibus B. G. Teubneri, 1869.

10th-century manuscripts
Virgil